Dancing in the Dust can refer to:

 Dancing in the Dust (1988 film), a 1988 Ivorian film
 Dancing in the Dust (2003 film), a 2003 Iranian film